ATCL may refer to:

Air Tanzania Company Limited, the state-owned airline of Tanzania
Associate of Trinity College London